Elvira's Haunted Hills is a 2001 American comedy horror film directed by Sam Irvin and written by Cassandra Peterson and John Paragon. It is the second film starring Peterson in the title role (credited as Elvira), after the 1988 theatrical release Elvira: Mistress of the Dark. The film also stars Richard O'Brien and Mary Scheer.

The film opened on the July 5, 2001 weekend at the Laemmle Fairfax Cinemas in Los Angeles after premiering at the International Rocky Horror Fan Convention on 23 June 2001. It was released direct-to-video on 31 October 2002.

Plot
In 1851 in the Carpathian Mountains of Romania, Elvira and her maidservant Zou Zou (Mary Jo Smith), on their way to a can-can revue in Paris, get kicked out of an inn for a slight monetary discrepancy. After making their way out of the village, they are rescued by Dr. Bradley Bradley (Scott Atkinson), who takes them to stay at Castle Hellsubus, in the hills high above the village. While there, Elvira meets the residents—and discovers that she happens to resemble the deceased former wife of his Lordship the Count Vladimere Hellsubus.

Cast
 Cassandra Peterson as Elvira / Lady Elura Hellsubus
 Richard O'Brien as Lord Vladimere Hellsubus
 Mary Scheer as Lady Ema Hellsubus
 Scott Atkinson as Dr. Bradley Bradley
 Gabriel Andronache as Adrian
 Mary Jo Smith as Zou Zou
 Heather Hopper as Lady Roxanna Hellsubus
 Remus Cernat as Nicholai Hellsubus 
 Lucia Maier as the maid 
 Jerry Jackson as the English gentleman
 Theodor Danetti as the innkeeper

Production
The film was privately funded without the use of a film studio. Peterson and her then-husband Mark Pierson mortgaged their house and apartment building to raise $1 million and obtained additional funds from relatives. It was filmed in Transylvania, Romania, and promoted at film festivals and horror/sci-fi conventions. The film parodies the Roger Corman-directed Edgar Allan Poe films of the early 1960s, and is dedicated to Vincent Price. The film also parodies British horror films from Hammer Studios. Mention of this is made on the featurette contained within the DVD of the film. Scott Atkinson's character is clearly evocative of Price, who starred in many of the Poe films.

Reception 
Elvira's Haunted Hills holds a 69% approval rating on review aggregator website Rotten Tomatoes, based on 12 reviews. In an unfavorable review, Ty Burr in the Boston Globe rated it as "A sloppy slapstick throwback to long gone bottom-of-the-bill fare like The Ghost and Mr. Chicken." In a positive review in the New York Post, Lou Lumenick said the film is "More entertaining than much of the big-studio schlock out there."

Awards
 2002 Provincetown International Film Festival: Best Feature – Audience Award

References

External links
 
 

2001 comedy horror films

2000s ghost films
2001 independent films
2000s parody films
2001 films
American comedy horror films
American haunted house films
American independent films
American parody films 
American sequel films
Elvira, Mistress of the Dark
Films about witchcraft
Films based on television series
Films directed by Sam Irvin
Films set in the 1850s
Films set in castles
Films set in Romania
Films shot in Bucharest
MediaPro Pictures films
Parodies of horror
2000s English-language films
2000s American films